Martina Hingis and Sabine Lisicki were the defending champions, but Lisicki chose not to participate this year.  Hingis played alongside Sania Mirza and successfully defended the title, defeating Ekaterina Makarova and Elena Vesnina in the final, 7–5, 6–1. The win in the final allowed Hingis and Mirza to be the fourth doubles partnership in history to win the Sunshine Double.

Seeds

Draw

Finals

Top half

Bottom half

References
 Main Draw

Women's Doubles
Women in Florida